TITC may refer to:

 The IT Crowd, a British sitcom
 Trapped in the Closet, a rap opera by R. Kelly